Bomarea angustifolia is a species of flowering plant in the family Alstroemeriaceae. It is endemic to Ecuador, where it is known from a single collection made during the first half of the 19th century. It is not clear exactly where the specimen was collected, but it may have been near Loja.

Sources

Endemic flora of Ecuador
Angustifolia
Critically endangered plants
Taxonomy articles created by Polbot